Dejazmach Balcha Safo (1863 – 6 November 1936), popularly referred to by his horse-name Abba Nefso, was an Ethiopian military commander and lord protector of the crown, who served in both the First and Second Italo-Ethiopian Wars.

Originally of humble birth, Balcha Safo, along with Habte Giyorgis Dinagde, was one of many Agemja prisoners of war during Ethiopian Emperor Menelik II's expansions south between 1875 and 1889. He came to the notice of Emperor Menelik II, who brought him back to Addis Ababa where Balcha was educated. His ethnicity is disputed with some sources claiming that he was an ethnic Gurage and others claiming he was an ethnic Oromo. He made his reputation, according to oral tradition, in the Battle of Mek'ele, and later at the Battle of Adwa (March 1, 1896), and was rewarded with elevation to the aristocratic status of dejazmach. Later Balcha was appointed a provincial Governor (Shum). He was later a key member of the conservative provincial elite who, in the 1920s, were often at odds with the modernising reforms and rising power of the Regent, Ras Tafari Makonnen. Tafari Makonnen would later force Dejazmach Balcha into retirement, albeit an honourable one, in 1928, from which he would emerge in 1935 to fight against the Fascist invasion, resulting in his death in 1936.

Biography

Early career 

Balcha came to the notice of Emperor Menelik II who brought him back to Addis Ababa where he was educated.
He distinguished himself at the imperial court and showed particular skill in military exercises and theory. He made his reputation, according to oral tradition, in the Battle of Mek'ele, and later at the Battle of Adwa, after which he was rewarded with elevation to the aristocratic status of dejazmach.

From 1898 to 1908, Balcha was Shum (or governor) of Sidamo province.  After the death of Dejazmach Yilma Mekonen in 1907, he became the Shum of Harar from 1910 to 1914. From 1917 to 1928, he again served as Shum of Sidamo.

Conflict with Haile Selassie 

A conservative who had been loyal to the memory of the deceased Emperor Menelik, Balcha was one of the leading nobles who challenged the growing power of the regent Ras Tafari (who later became Emperor Haile Selassie). A blunt old warrior, he did not trust the young regent, unlike most other warlords who by this time had all submitted themselves to Tafari in his ambition to consolidate power. In a deft political manoeuvrer, which has since been seen as an example of Haile Selassie's cunning, in 1928 the regent invited Balcha to the capital for a feast in Balcha's honour. Balcha arrived 11 February with several thousand men most of whom he left camped right outside of Addis Ababa at an area called Nifas Silk. Balcha and around 600 of his men functioning as bodyguards went to the feast itself in Addis, and spent the evening "generally insolent and threatening in conversation." Ras Tafari was nervous in private. Zewditu begged Balcha in the name of her late father, Emperor Menelik II.

Meanwhile, the regent sent Ras Kassa Haile Darge to Balcha's camp, where he lied to the troops stating that Balcha and Regent Ras Tafari were in agreement, and paid the soldiers Balcha had left there. This led to Balcha's army  exchanging their weapons for gold and other monetary or valuable gifts and dispersed. At the same time, the regent quietly appointed Dejazmach Birru Wolde Gabriel to replace Balcha as governor of Sidamo. These simultaneous acts deprived Balcha of his ability to resist, a loss he discovered only after he returned to the camp. Balcha promised a peaceful transition to the empress and lay down his sword, which was the traditional way of giving up his power in respect to the Empress.

Death 

During the Second Italo-Abyssinian War, Balcha Safo came out of retirement to fight against the Italians. Major Mesfin Sileshi, an agent of the imperial government in exile who was coordinating resistance in occupied Ethiopia, writes of his fate in a letter to Haile Selassie I thus:

See also 

 Ethiopian coup d'état of 1928
 Gugsa Welle
 Hailu Tekle Haymanot

References 

1863 births
1936 deaths
Ethiopian generals
Ethiopian military personnel killed in action